Tavfer–Measindot–Mortágua is a Portuguese men's cycling team focusing on junior development. The team was founded by former professional racing cyclist Pedro Silva.

History
Velo Clube do Centro was established in 1999 as Mortágua Clube duas Rodas. Based in Mortágua, the club achieved several national championships in diverse categories.

For the 2018 season, Federação Portuguesa de Ciclismo allotted three new licenses for development teams, the team was promoted to UCI Continental status with sponsorship from Miranda e Irmão, a bicycle components company based in Águeda, and Mortágua municipality, supporters from the very beginning.

Team roster

Major wins
Sources:

2003
  Under-23 Road Race Championships, Hélio Costa
2004
 Stage 1 Volta a Portugal do Futuro, Manuel Cardoso
2006
 Volta a Portugal do Futuro
Stages 1 & 4, Bruno Sancho
Stage 5, Márcio Barbosa
2009
  Under-23 Road Race Championships, Vasco Pereira
2010
 Volta a Portugal do Futuro
 Points classification, Pedro Paulinho
Prologue, Team time trial
Stage 2, António Carvalho
Stage 4, Pedro Paulinho
 Stage 4 Volta à Madeira, Pedro Paulinho
2011
 Volta a Portugal do Futuro
Stage 2, Pedro Paulinho
 Points classification, António Carvalho 
2014
  Under-23 Road Race Championships, Joaquim Silva
 Volta a Portugal do Futuro
Stage 2, Carlos Ribeiro
Team classification
 Points classification, Carlos Ribeiro
2015
  Under-23 Time Trial Championships, José Fernandes
2017
  Under-23 Road Race Championships, Francisco Campos
2018
 Volta a Portugal do Futuro
Stages 3 & 4, Francisco Campos
Stage 5, Jorge Magalhaes
2021
 Stages 2 & 3 Volta ao Alentejo, Iúri Leitão
2022
 Stage 3 Volta ao Alentejo, Leangel Linarez
 Stages 2 & 4 Volta a Portugal, João Matias

National champions
2003
  Portuguese Under-23 Road race, Hélio Costa
2009
  Portuguese Under-23 Road race, Vasco Pereira
2014
  Portuguese Under-23 Road race, Joaquim Silva
2015
  Portuguese Under-23 time trial, José Fernandes
2017
  Portuguese Under-23 Road race, Francisco Campos

Notes

References

External links
 

UCI Continental Teams (Europe)
Cycling teams based in Portugal
Cycling teams established in 1999
1999 establishments in Portugal